Percnia luridaria is a species of moth of the family Geometridae first described by John Henry Leech in 1897. It is found in Taiwan.

Subspecies
Percnia luridaria luridaria
Percnia luridaria meridionalis Wehrli, 1939
Percnia luridaria nominoneura Prout, 1914 (Taiwan)

References

Moths described in 1897
Ennominae